Warrenton–Fauquier Airport  is a public airport 14 miles southeast of Warrenton, a town in Fauquier County, Virginia.

Most U.S. airports use the same three-letter location identifier for the FAA and IATA, but this airport is HWY to the FAA and has no IATA code.

Facilities
Its single runway, 15/33, is  asphalt.

In the year ending June 29, 2007 the airport had 42,184 aircraft operations, average 115 per day: 98% general aviation, 1% air taxi and <1% military. 119 aircraft were then based at this airport: 84% single-engine (100), 13% multi-engine, 3% ultralight and 1% helicopter.

See also
 
 List of airports in Virginia

References

External links

 

Airports in Virginia
Transportation in Fauquier County, Virginia